The 2010 Men's South American Hockey Championship was the third edition of the Men's South American Hockey Championship, the South American championship for men's national field hockey teams, organized by the PAHF. It was held from 3 to 11 April 2010 in Rio de Janeiro, Brazil.

The finalists, Argentina and Chile qualified for the 2011 Pan American Games. Argentina, the defending champions, won their third title in a row by defeating Chile 3–0 in the final.

Results

Pool

Classification

Fifth and sixth place

Third and fourth place

Final

Statistics

Final standings

 Qualified for the 2011 Pan American Games

Awards
The following awards were given at the conclusion of the tournament.

References

External links
PAHF page

Men's South American Hockey Championship
South American Championship
International field hockey competitions hosted by Brazil
South American Hockey Championship Men
International sports competitions in Rio de Janeiro (city)
2010s in Rio de Janeiro
April 2010 sports events in South America